Vũ Trinh (1759–1828) (pseudonyms 萊山 and 蘭池漁者) was a well-known Confucianist in Tonkin and high-ranking mandarin in both Le Trinh dynasty and Nguyen dynasty. Vũ Trinh was born in a noble family with many proficient Confucian scholars in Ngọc Quan hamlet, Lương Tài district, Bắc Ninh. His grandfather was Vũ Miên: headmaster of Quốc Tử Giám and chancellor. He got title giải nguyên (解元) (first laureate) in the interprovincial Confucian examination that was held every three years with small quantity of selected candidates when he was only 16, then became a mandarin. In his career path, at very young age (28 years old), he was promoted to be vice chancellor (參知政事).

He declined the invitation of Ngô Thì Nhậm, a great mandarin of Tay Son for a mandarin position. For this, he was mentioned in a poem written by Nguyễn Đề, stored in the Qing dynasty's literature records:

次東山偶憶蘭溪漁者

東魯行車雨雪飛，

偶懷閒客釣魚磯。

二倫情誼心相合，

十載窮通命每違。

不審役形當世事，

何如拭目看時機。

首陽今日無人問，

也任夷齊採盡薇。

Along with being a mandarin, he was also a writer. His legacies were mostly written in Chinese. He played an important role in Chèo, for instance Lưu Bình-Dương Lễ.

Notable works
使燕詩集
宮怨詩集
見聞錄
皇越律例 (Gia Long code)
劉平揚禮

References 
 皇黎一統志, 吳家文派
 大南列傳
 國史遺編, 潘叔直

1759 births
1828 deaths
People from Bắc Ninh province
Vietnamese Confucianists
People of Revival Lê dynasty